The Halifax–Dartmouth Ferry is the oldest saltwater ferry in North America, and the second oldest in the world (after the Mersey Ferry linking Liverpool and Birkenhead). Today the service is operated by Halifax Transit and links Downtown Halifax with two locations, Alderney Landing and Woodside, in Dartmouth, NS.

Origins 
The first ferry service in the region was put in place by the founder of Halifax Edward Cornwallis, who used the ferry service to move raw materials and people from a sawmill located on the Dartmouth side of the harbour. During this time there was no official service and it was not until 1752, after a council meeting, that the first ferry charter was issued to John Connor This began the official ferry service between Halifax and Dartmouth. At this time regulations stated that the boats would be run from sunrise until sunset through weekdays with a fare of three pence. In these early stages there was no schedule. Patrons would simply walk down to the pier and be taken across as needed. Connor operated the ferry for only one year and after his departure the operation of the ferry changed hands twice more before 1786.

History 
The first true ferry to be employed in the harbour was not until 1816 the Sherbrooke classified as a Horseboat being powered by (in Sherbrooke's case) nine horses walking in a circular motion in the centre of the ferry powering the central paddle. This ferry was thought to be a large improvement to the previous service due to its speed and ability to transport more people and cargo from either side of the harbour. This ferry operated in the harbour until 1830 when the first steam ferry, the Sir Charles Ogle, entered service. The continuing ferry service remained the only effective way of crossing the harbour until 1955, when the Angus L. Macdonald Bridge was first opened.

The current generation of the ferry system was implemented by the former City of Dartmouth as part of major revitalization projects undertaken in both Dartmouth and Halifax in the 1970s. All five ferries currently in service were designed by Bedford-based company, E.Y.E. Marine Consultants. In 1994, the City of Dartmouth transferred control of the ferry system to Metro Transit, later known as Halifax Transit.

Current operation 
Today Halifax Transit maintains and operates the ferry service by providing two passenger ferry routes, one connecting downtown Halifax with Alderney Landing in Dartmouth (which operates daily) and the other connecting downtown Halifax with Woodside (Monday through Friday only). The harbour ferries are utilized by over 3,000 commuters daily.  Both routes operate using two vessels each on a fifteen-minute schedule during peak hours, and using one vessel each on a thirty-minute schedule off-peak.

Christopher Stannix 
In early 2013 Halifax Transit announced that they would be purchasing what would be the first of five new harbour passager ferry to augment the now-aging fleet currently in service. The Vessel will be built by A. F. Theriault Shipyard, for a cost of $3,987,400. To maintain compatibility with the existing ferry terminal facilities, the new vessel will use the same hull design first used in the Halifax III in 1979. However, updates are planned for many of the ship's systems as well as the interior. The name of the vessel was chosen by the people of Halifax after a competition conducted by Halifax Transit. At the end of the competition over 12,800 votes were cast with the name Christopher Stannix winning 61% of the votes. MCpl Christopher Stannix was a local army reservist with The Princess Louise Fusiliers. He was killed in April 2007 by an improvised explosive device while serving in Afghanistan.

In early June 2014, the winner of the competition to name the new ferry was announced. (Corporal) Darrel MacDonald, a former member of The Princess Louise Fusiliers and a resident of Halifax, was the first person to submit the "Christopher Stannix" name for voting. He was awarded a full year transit pass and reportedly donated it to the IWK Health Centre (Women and Newborn Health Social Work Department). The passes were converted to sheets of single-use transit tickets and will be passed out at the discretion of the staff within the department.

Fleet renewal 
Following completion of the Christopher Stannix, Halifax Regional Council approved the purchase of two additional new ferries, expected to be delivered in spring 2015 and 2016 respectively. Two aging members of Halifax Transit's existing fleet will be retired when these vessels are delivered.  These ferries will be built by A. F. Theriault Shipyard, the same yard responsible for the Christopher Stannix. The first of these two ferries, named the Craig Blake after another Canadian Forces member killed in Afghanistan, entered service in 2015. Another ferry is expected to enter service in 2016, named after Viola Desmond.  On December 6, 2016, Regional Council approved the purchase of two more ferries.  This purchase will allow the service to operate with two modern, reliable ferries on each routes, and one spare for routine maintenance and unexpected breakdowns.

Fast ferry service 
In recent years, following unfulfilled plans to implement commuter rail, the municipality has begun to plan several new high speed ferry routes on Halifax Harbour, including service to Purcell's Cove, Bedford, Eastern Passage and Shannon Park. These routes would be served by wave piercing catamarans capable of speeds of approximately 40 knots. Details have not been finalized, however it is likely that the downtown Halifax terminal would act as a hub, with all routes radiating outward. Studies and trials have been undertaken for a Bedford-Halifax route, which will likely be the first high speed service.

References

External links
 Halifax Transit's official website

Transport in Halifax, Nova Scotia
Transit agencies in Nova Scotia
Ferry companies of Nova Scotia